Júlio César de Rezende Miranda (born Júlio César Gomes da Silva; 2 January 1995), commonly known as Rezende, is a Brazilian footballer who plays as a defensive midfielder for Bahia.

Club career
Born in Rio de Janeiro, Rezende was a Madureira youth graduate. He made his first team debut on 27 August 2014, starting in a 2–0 away win over Campo Grande, for the year's Copa Rio.

Rezende scored his first senior goal on 17 April 2016, netting the opener in a 1–1 Campeonato Carioca home draw against Volta Redonda. Regularly used by Madura, he was loaned to Portuguesa-RJ in April 2017.

Rezende returned to Madureira for the 2018 season, but was again loaned to Portuguesa on 18 April 2019. On 11 November of that year, he joined Resende.

In July 2020, Rezende signed for Treze, but finished the season winning the Campeonato Paranaense Série Prata with Azuriz. On 7 June 2021, he was presented at Série B side Goiás, on loan from Azuriz.

Despite being a regular starter in Goiás' promotion to the Série A, Rezende left the club on 10 December 2021, after failing to agree a permanent contract. Eleven days later, he signed a two-year deal with Bahia, also helping in a top tier promotion at the end of the season.

Personal life
Rezende was raised by his aunt Estela, after her sister thought about aborting him. He was later adopted by Estela and her husband, changing his surnames Gomes da Silva to de Rezende Miranda. His adoptive father deceased in 2020.

Career statistics

Honours
Treze
Campeonato Paraibano: 2020

Azuriz
Campeonato Paranaense Série Prata: 2020

References

1995 births
Living people
Footballers from Rio de Janeiro (city)
Brazilian footballers
Association football midfielders
Campeonato Brasileiro Série B players
Campeonato Brasileiro Série C players
Campeonato Brasileiro Série D players
Madureira Esporte Clube players
Associação Atlética Portuguesa (RJ) players
Resende Futebol Clube players
Treze Futebol Clube players
Azuriz Futebol Clube players
Goiás Esporte Clube players
Esporte Clube Bahia players